Estadio Ciudad de Lanús – Néstor Díaz Pérez, also known as La Fortaleza (The Fortress), is a football stadium in Lanús, Argentina, and home ground of Club Atlético Lanús. The stadium holds 47,027 people and was built in 1929. In September 2010, the club started construction on a roof for the local stand, which has since been completed. Several other works were completed in 2014, these additions consisting in a new changing rooms, a press conference room, an official club shop, a highly competitive gym, a café for club members and a secondary school behind the stadium. 

The stadium is named after Néstor Díaz Pérez, former president of the club under whose mandate the stadium was built.

History 

Club Lanús' first stadium was located on Wield and Deheza streets, north side from the Buenos Aires Great Southern Railway tracks. The team was promoted to Primera División in 1919, debuting in 1920 v Sportivo Almagro in the old venue. In 1929, the club built a new stadium on Inocencio Arias (nowadays, Héctor Guidi) and General Acha streets, 650 mts from the former venue. The stadium was inaugurated on February 24, 1929. One year after, the club expanded the capacity of the venue, building new grandstands, to 30,000 spectators.

In early 1960s the club built the first concrete grandstand at the stadium, with a sector for the press, while the rest of the venue still was made of wood. In 1993, Lanús started works to refurbish the stadium with the purpose of replacing all the wood grandstands by concrete structures and other improvements, nevertheless works were delayed and they were not completed until 2003.

Lanús stadium hosted its first international club matches in the 2008 Copa Libertadores, where Lanús debuted, defeating the Uruguayan side Danubio 3–1. Lanús' international games at its own stadium also included matches of Copa Sudamericana.

References

External links

 
 Photo Gallery on Europlan football magazine

la
Club Atlético Lanús
Sports venues in Buenos Aires Province